The King Abdulaziz Stadium is a multi-purpose stadium in Mecca, Saudi Arabia, the holy capital.  It is the largest stadium in Mecca and is currently used mainly for football matches. The stadium holds 38,000 people, and is the home ground of Al-Wehda. The stadium was temporarily used by Jeddah clubs Al-Ittihad and Al-Ahli due to stadiums in Jeddah undergoing construction, and given the proximity.

References

1986 establishments in Saudi Arabia
Buildings and structures in Mecca
Football venues in Saudi Arabia
Multi-purpose stadiums in Saudi Arabia
Sport in Mecca